Nomer may refer to:

Nomer Tamid, synagogue in Poland
Sovkhoz Nomer Shest, town in Armavir, Armenia